The 2012 Keio Challenger was a professional tennis tournament played on hard courts. It was the eighth edition of the tournament which was part of the 2012 ATP Challenger Tour. It took place in Yokohama, Japan between 12 and 18 November 2012.

Singles main-draw entrants

Seeds

 1 Rankings are as of November 5, 2012.

Other entrants
The following players received wildcards into the singles main draw:
  Toshihide Matsui
  Yoshihito Nishioka
  Masato Shiga
  Kaichi Uchida

The following players received entry from the qualifying draw:
  Yuichi Ito
  Yuuya Kibi
  Shuichi Sekiguchi
  Michael Venus

Champions

Singles

 Matteo Viola def.  Mirza Bašić, 7–6(7–3), 6–3

Doubles

 Prakash Amritraj /  Philipp Oswald def.  Sanchai Ratiwatana /  Sonchat Ratiwatana, 6–3, 6–4

External links
[http Official Website]